Moqokori is a District in Hiiraan, Somalia.

Notable people 

 Abdullahi Mohamed Ali, politician
 Yusuf Ahmed Hagar Dabageed, politician

References

Populated places in Hiran, Somalia